Minga Branch is a stream in the U.S. state of Mississippi.

Minga most is a name derived from the Chickasaw language meaning "chief".

References

Rivers of Mississippi
Rivers of Monroe County, Mississippi
Mississippi placenames of Native American origin